Tillandsia confinis is a species of flowering plant in the genus Tillandsia. This species is native to Venezuela, Bolivia Colombia, Peru, northern Brazil, and Ecuador.

Two varieties are recognized:

Tillandsia confinis var. confinis - most of species range
Tillandsia confinis var. caudata L.B.Sm. - Colombia, Ecuador

References

confinis
Flora of South America
Plants described in 1953